The Hutton Sandstone is a geological formation of the Surat Basin in Queensland, Australia. The ferruginous sandstones and coal were deposited in a floodplain environment and dates back to the Bajocian.

References 

Geologic formations of Australia
Jurassic System of Australia
Bajocian Stage
Sandstone formations
Coal formations
Coal in Australia
Paleontology in Queensland